Toshi may refer to:

 Toshi (given name), people with the given name Toshi
 Toshihiko Tahara (born 1961), Japanese idol singer, a solo vocalist
 Toshi (musician) (Toshimitsu Deyama, born 1965), a Japanese singer and musician
 Toshi (comedian) (Toshikazu Miura, born 1976), member of the comedian group Taka and Toshi
 Toshi Automatic (Company), refers to an Indian Automation Company named Toshi Automatic Systems Private Limited
 Toshi Sabri, an Indian singer
 Toshi (American Dad), a recurring character in the show American Dad!
 TOSHI, a fourth-generation cross-platform game engine developed by Blue Tongue Entertainment
 Toshi (search engine), a full-text search engine in Rust (programming language)

See also
 Aiko, Princess Toshi of Japan
 Tama Toshi Monorail Line, Japanese monorail line in western Tokyo
 Yôjû toshi (Wicked City), a Japanese horror novel
 Wicked City (1987 film), an anime film based on the novel
 The Wicked City (1992 film), a live-action film based on the novel